Boulenophrys obesa is a species of frog in the family Megophryidae. Its type locality is Heishiding Nature Reserve, Fengkai County, Guangdong Province, China.

References

obesa
Frogs of China
Endemic fauna of China
Amphibians described in 2014